Thommo Reachea IV (1706–1747), born Ang Em, was a Cambodian king during Post-Angkor Period (r. 1747).

Thommo Reachea IV was a son of Thommo Reachea III. He ascended the throne after his father's death in 1747. He struggled for power with his brother Ang Hing and brother-in-law Ang Tong. In the same year he was murdered by Ang Hing; then Ang Hing was murdered by Ang Tong.

References

 Achille Dauphin-Meunier, Histoire du Cambodge, Que sais-je ? N° 916, P.U.F 1968.
 Anthony Stokvis, Manuel d'histoire, de généalogie et de chronologie de tous les États du globe, depuis les temps les plus reculés jusqu'à nos jours, préf. H. F. Wijnman, éditions Brill Leyde 1888, réédition 1966, Volume I part1: Asie, chapitre XIV §.9 « Kambodge » Listes et  tableau généalogique n°34  p. 337-338. 
 Peter Truhart, Regents of Nations, K.G Saur Münich, 1984-1988 , Art. « Kampuchea », p. 1732.
 Phoeun Mak. « L'introduction de la Chronique royale du Cambodge du lettré Nong ». Dans : Bulletin de l'École française d'Extrême-Orient. Tome 67, 1980. p. 135-145.

1706 births
1747 deaths
18th-century Cambodian monarchs